Locust Street is a major street in Center City Philadelphia. The street is the location of several prominent Philadelphia-based buildings, historic sights, and high-rise residential locations.  It is an east–west street throughout Center City Philadelphia and runs largely parallel to Chestnut Street, another major Center City Philadelphia street.

Locust Street locations
Historical Society of Pennsylvania, the primary historical society for Pennsylvania, is located at 1300 Locust Street.
Jefferson Health, a major Philadelphia healthcare network, maintains one of its primary outpatient facilities at 1020 Locust Street.
Library Company of Philadelphia, the nation's oldest library founded by Benjamin Franklin in 1731, is located at 1314 Locust Street. It houses approximately 500,000 books and 70,000 other items, including 2,150 items that once belonged to Franklin, the Mayflower Compact, major Revolutionary-era documents, and the first editions of Moby-Dick and Leaves of Grass.

References

External links

Center City, Philadelphia
Culture of Philadelphia
Economy of Philadelphia
Streets in Philadelphia